Charlesville is an unincorporated community in Tintah Township, Traverse County, and North Ottawa Township, Grant County in the U.S. state of Minnesota.

Notes

Unincorporated communities in Traverse County, Minnesota
Unincorporated communities in Grant County, Minnesota
Unincorporated communities in Minnesota